Fernand Isselé (22 February 1915 – May 1994) was a Belgian water polo player who competed in the 1936 Summer Olympics and in the 1948 Summer Olympics.

In 1936 he was part of the Belgian team which won the bronze medal. He played all seven matches.

Twelve years later at the 1948 Summer Olympics he was a member of the Belgian team which finished fourth in the 1948 tournament. He also played all seven matches.

See also
 List of Olympic medalists in water polo (men)

References
Fernand Isselé's obituary

External links
 

1915 births
1994 deaths
Belgian male water polo players
Olympic bronze medalists for Belgium
Olympic water polo players of Belgium
Water polo players at the 1936 Summer Olympics
Water polo players at the 1948 Summer Olympics
Olympic medalists in water polo
Medalists at the 1936 Summer Olympics
Sportspeople from Bruges